The 1984 United States Senate election in Oklahoma was held on November 6, 1984.

Incumbent Senator David Boren was re-elected to a second term in office in a landslide.

Democratic primary

Candidates
 David Boren, incumbent Senator
 Marshall A. Luse, independent candidate for Oklahoma's 4th congressional district in 1982

Results

Republican primary

Candidates
 William Crozier, management instructor and nominee for Oklahoma's 4th congressional district in 1972
 Gar Graham, Democratic candidate for Senate in 1980
 George L. Mothershed, Oklahoma City attorney

Results

Independents and third parties

Libertarian
 Robert T. Murphy, nominee for Senate in 1980

General election

Results

See also 
 1984 United States Senate elections

References 

1984
Oklahoma
United States Senate